Line 14 of the Beijing Subway is a rapid transit rail line in the south and east of Beijing. The line is operated by the Beijing MTR Corporation Limited.

Line 14 will be  in length and have 36 stations (33 in operation).

Description

The infill Qilizhuang station opened on February 15, 2014.

East section: The east section opened in two phases. Infills Chaoyang Park station and Pingleyuan station opened on 31 December 2016 and 30 December 2017 respectively.

Rolling Stock
Line 14 uses DKZ53 and SFM18 trains. They are the first high-capacity wide-body A-Type trains in the Beijing Subway. These trains were designed in nine months by Changchun Railway Vehicles Co., Ltd. and there are now 63 six-car A-Type trains operating on Line 14. These trains entered revenue service 15 months after contract award.

List of stations
Service A:  to 
Service B:  to

Route
The precise route of Line 14 has been revised several times even after construction began.

The line is designed to follow an inverted-L shaped route running from the southwestern corner of urban Beijing in Fengtai District to the northeastern corner in Chaoyang District. Currently, the west section and east section of Line 14 are operated separately, while the middle section is still under construction.

The line crosses the river to Zhangyi Village and enters the 5th Ring Road.

The middle section continues on Lize Road inside the 3rd Ring Road and then meets Line 4 at the Beijing South railway station.

The east section runs east from Beijing South railway station. Then it runs north, between the eastern 3rd and 4th Ring Roads. Further north, the Xidawang Road turns into Jintai Road. The line crosses Line 6 at Jintailu and runs north through Chaoyang Park. Upon leaving the 4th Ring Road, Line 14 enters the vast Wangjing sub-district. The line bisects Wangjing from south to north on Guangshun South and North Streets and intersects with Line 15 at the heart of Wangjing. After leaving Wangjing, the line emerges north of the 5th Ring Road and terminates at Shangezhuang.

History
 Sept. 23, 2008: Construction of Line 14 set to begin by the end of 2008.
 Nov. 6, 2009: Commencement of construction deferred; may begin by the end of 2009
 Jan. 7, 2010: Commencement of construction set to begin in 2010.
 Apr. 29, 2010: Construction begins.
May 5, 2013: The West section, from Zhangguozhuang to Xiju opens.
February 15, 2014: An infill station on west section, Qilizhuang Station opens.
 December 28, 2014: The 1st part of east section, from Shangezhuang Station to Jintailu Station opens.
 December 26, 2015: The 2nd part of east section, from Jintailu Station to Beijing South railway station, opens.
 December 31, 2016: An infill station on East section, Chaoyang Park station opens.
 December 30, 2017: An infill station on East section, Pingleyuan station opens.
 December 31, 2021: The middle section from Xiju to Beijing South Railway Station opens.

Opening timeline

West extension
There was a plan to extended Line 14 from its western terminus, Zhangguozhuang station. However in July 2022, it was announced the western extension of Line 14 is replaced by the branch of Line 1.

Controversy

Western terminal
The proposed final routing of Line 14 headed through Zhangyicun, near Marco Polo Bridge. However, residents of Dujiakan and nearby Wanpingcheng wanted the subway to be routed south and terminating in their neighborhoods instead. Wanpingcheng residents argued that the neighborhood's more than 60,000 residents as well as a sculpture park, a war memorial, Wanping Fortress (Wanpingcheng) and many other attractions need better public transport options. In addition roads going through Dujiakan are severely congested with traffic. The terrain, rivers and railways going through the area have made it difficult to construct new roads to the surrounding areas. The end of 2008, residents gathered thousands of signatures. Finally, the Planning Commission explained that building a subway to Wanpingcheng is more difficult, Line 14 will run via Zhangyicun as originally planned. Ultimately, Wanpingcheng will be served by Wanpingcheng station on Line 16 which started construction in 2013.

Northern terminal

By the end of 2009, Tiantongyuan and Wangjing residents disputed the proposed alignment of Line 14's northern portion. Tiantongyuan is a large residential area within Beijing's northern Changping District. Tiantongyuan is heavily dependent on Beiyuan road, Anli Road and Subway Line 5. Both roads and the Metro line suffer from congestion. The existing Line 5 only serves the west side of Tiantongyuan and is over capacity. The Tiantongyuan online community launched a petition to extend Line 14 into Tiantongyuan. Tiantongyuan and its periphery argue that with the new developments being built in the area, traffic demand will be large. The extension of Line 14 into the area will improve access and transport capacity. Wangjing residents opposed the proposal put forward by Tiantongyuan residents believing that the huge passenger flow from an extension to Tiantongyuan will overwhelm Line 14 which is already slated to serve their neighborhood.  Wangjing is a large community with significant commercial areas in Chaoyang District north east of the fourth ring road. Although numerous buses connect Wangjing with its vicinity and the city center, it is still suffering from traffic congestion. The existing Line 13 Wangjing West station is too far from the commercial center of Wangjing, making access inconvenient. Wangjing residents proposed Line 14 to terminate at Wangjing as originally planned. The proposal by Tiantongyuan residents was rejected by planning authorities. Instead authorities proposed to construct a new north south express subway line called Line 17 (formerly R2 line) through eastern Tiantongyuan to better serve the area. Construction of Line 17 began in 2015.

References

Beijing Subway lines
MTR Corporation
Railway lines opened in 2013
2013 establishments in China
1500 V DC railway electrification